Equestrian at the 1996 Summer Paralympics consisted of nine events. All events were mixed, meaning that men and women competed together.

Medal table

Participating nations

Medal summary

See also
Equestrian at the 1996 Summer Olympics

References 

 

1996 Summer Paralympics events
1996
1996 in equestrian
Para Dressage